UKRSIBBANK BNP Paribas Group is a commercial bank based in Ukraine. UKRSIBBANK has been operating in the Ukrainian market since 1990. It operates a network of 260 branches and 1,000 ATMs throughout Ukraine, for 2 million customers all around Ukraine, 170,000 SME companies, and 600 large corporate companies. The bank has been a subsidiary of French International bank BNP Paribas since 2006.

Bank awards

TOP-3 among Ukraine’s most sustainable banks according to the popular Ukrainian online media Forinsurer.com

TOP Employer 2020 in Ukraine and Europe as part of BNP Paribas, Top Employer Institute Certification

No.1 in the Ukrainian Bank's Viability Rating according to the independent business portal Mind.UA

No.2 as The Best Internet Bank according to the FinAwards2020

No.3 UKRSIB online as the Best Mobile Bank according to the FinAwards2020 results

ТОР-3 among Ukraine’s Best Employers in Financial Sector according to the independent Randstad Employer Brand Research

Payment Card Industry Data Security Standard Certification – International Security Audit (PCI DSS)

Women In Business, the Program to Support Female Entrepreneurs, was included in the first report of the UN Global Compact for Ukraine as part of its commitment to achieving 17 sustainable development goals

No.1 among Ukrainian banks for depositor loyalty according to the Minfin portal

No.2 in the Minfin Portal’s Bank Resilience Rating following the 2Q of 2020

No.2 in the Ukrainian Banks Viability Rating according to the independent business portal Mind.UA

Best Legal Departments 2020 following the independent survey «Top-50 Legal Departments of Ukraine»

No.2 in the Most Reliable Banks of Ukraine Rating according to the investment company Dragon Capital

Good Place to Work – The Best Employer Branding Project, HR Brand Ukraine Award grc.ua. The Best Premium Banking Service in Ukraine according to Mastercard.

ТОР-3 «Cycling-Friendly Employer 2020» according to the Kyiv Cyclists’ Association U-Cycle

No.1 «Sustainable Development Goal No.3 — Good Health and Well-Being» in the context of Corporate Social Responsibility cases 2020, Center for the CSR Development Ukraine.

History
UKRSIBBANK was founded in 1990. Over the first two years, it operated on the financial market as Kharkiv regional bank that serviced large corporate customers.

In 1996 the bank started opening branches in other regions of Ukraine, and since 2000 it has been building up an extensive branch network. Being actively engaged in servicing individuals and legal entities, UKRSIBBANK has been constantly extending the list of banking services and products and conquering new market segments.

In December 2005, UKRSIBBANK, the third-largest bank in Ukraine, and BNP Paribas, one of the world's largest financial groups, signed a share purchase agreement on 51% of UKRSIBBANK's shares.

In April 2006, one of the largest financial groups in the world, BNP Paribas became the strategic investor at UKRSIBBANK, with a share of 51%. In 2009, the share increased to 81.42%, and in 2010 to 99.99%. In August 2011, the procedure for the acquisition of 15% of shares of UKRSIBBANK was completed by the European Bank for Reconstruction and Development (EBRD), after that the share of BNP Paribas amounted to 84.99%.

In February 2016, the size of the EBRD's share increased to 40%, that's why, the share of BNP Paribas comprised 59.99%.

Integration with the BNP Paribas group has opened URSIBBANK new opportunities: involvement in the global brand, the use of advanced world experience, and the transition to new standards of management. UKRSIBBANK is a bank of positive changes.

In February 2018, BNP Paribas bought UKRSIBBANK shares from minority shareholders, increasing its share to 60%.

In 2019, the Bank is No. 2 among the most reliable banks in Ukraine according to the investment company Dragon Capital, which annually compiles a rating of bank reliability (TOP-20) for the popular publication NV.

In 2021, Expert Rating Agency confirmed the long-term credit rating of Ukrsibbank at uaAAA according to the national Ukrainian scale, which means the highest level of creditworthiness.

Activity
The bank has positions in corporate banking, retail banking, and in the consumer finance segment.

It offers banking products, such as online banking (all-inclusive package) and flexible deposits (Active Money).

One of the major world banking systems, BNP Paribas, which owns 60% of shares in the bank, is a strategic investor of JSC «UKRSIBBANK». International Company LLC AF «PriceWaterhouseCoopers (Audit)» and audit firm LLC «Ukrainian Audit Service» act as the bank's auditors.

Shareholders and Management Board

The official ceremony of the share purchase agreement signing, dedicated to purchasing of 51% of shares of JSC «UKRSIBBANK» took place on December 20, 2005. Today, the bank is 60% owned by BNP Paribas and 40% by the EBRD.

Members of the Management Board 
 Laurent Philippe Nicolas Charles Dupuch, Chairman of the Management Board
 Nataliia Savchuk, Deputy Chairman of the Management Board, Chief Operating Officer
 Andrii Kashperuk, Deputy Chairman of the Management Board of Retail Banking
 Konieczny Piotr Pawel, Deputy Chairman of the Management Board, Head of Finance Department
 Serhii Zagorulko, Deputy Chairman of the Management Board—IT Director
 Yuliia Kadulina, Deputy Chairman of the Management Board, Personal Finance Director
 Dmytrо Tsаpеnkо, Deputy Chairman of the Management Board, Head of the Corporate Banking Department
 Olena Polianchuk, Deputy Chairman of the Management Board, Head of Legal Department

Members of the Supervisory Board 
 François Bénaroya, Head of the Supervisory Board
 Luc Delvaux, Member of the Supervisory Board
 Mariusz Warych, Member of the Supervisory Board	
 Vincent Metz, Member of the Supervisory Board	
 Bertrand Barrier, Member of the Supervisory Board	
 Claire Lauzeral, Member of the Supervisory Board	
 Zulfira Akhmedova, Member of the Supervisory Board	
 Pierre Mietkowski, Member of the Supervisory Board	
 Dmytro Sholomko, Member of the Supervisory Board

Bank's membership 
 Principal member of Mastercard International
 Principal member of Visa International
 Ukrainian Interbank Exchange Market (UIEM)
 OJSC «Interregional Fund Union» (IFU)
 Ukrainian Banks Association (UBA)
 Kyiv Bank Union (KBU)
 First Stock Trading System (FSTS)
 SWIFT
 Ukrainian Individual Deposits Guarantee Fund
 Ukrainian Taxpayers Association
 Global ATM Alliance

See also 

List of banks in Ukraine

References

External links

 JSC «UKRSIBBANK»

Banks of Ukraine
BNP Paribas
Banks of the Soviet Union
European Bank for Reconstruction and Development joint ventures